Yitzhak Yosef (born January 16, 1952) is the Sephardi Chief Rabbi of Israel (known as the Rishon LeZion), the rosh yeshiva of Yeshivat Hazon Ovadia, and the author of a set of books on halakha (Jewish law) called Yalkut Yosef.

Yosef is the son of Ovadia Yosef, former Chief Rabbi of Israel, and bases his halakhic rulings on his father's methodology. His books are considered foundational among large sectors of Sephardic Jews in Israel and the world. For these books, he has won the Rabbi Toledano Prize from the Tel Aviv Religious Council, as well as the Rav Kook Prize.

Biography
Yitzhak Yosef was born in Jerusalem in 1952, the sixth son of the former Shas spiritual leader and Israeli Chief Rabbi, Ovadia Yosef. He attended school at Talmud Torah Yavneh in the Independent Education System. At age 12, he began his studies at the junior yeshiva of Porat Yosef in Katamon, Jerusalem. After that, he studied at Yeshivat HaNegev in Netivot, and from there, at Hebron Yeshiva in Jerusalem.

Yosef did not finish high school, and called secular studies "nonsense".

In 1971, when he was 18 and studying at Yeshivat HaNegev, Yosef collected halakhic rulings from the five volumes of Yavia Omer, the book of his father's responsa, that had been published by then, and published them in the book Yalkut Yosef. The book was published with his father's support and supervision. It is often considered one of his father's books, since not only is it a summary of his father's rulings, but the latter also went over it section by section and added his own comments.

Yosef is married to Ruth, daughter of the kabbalist Rachamim Attia. They have five children. His eldest son, named after his father Ovadia, is married to the daughter of Shlomo Amar. His daughter Margalit is married to the son of Yehuda Deri. His youngest daughter is married to the son of Meir Sage. Yosef lives in the Sanhedria Murhevet neighborhood of Jerusalem.

Rabbinic career

In 1973, with his father's election as Chief Rabbi of Israel, together they established the Kollel and Yeshiva "Hazon Ovadia". In 1980, Yosef was ordained as a rabbi and judge, along with the rest of the first class of the graduates, by the chief rabbis of Israel and by the chief rabbi of Jerusalem Shalom Messas. With the beginning of the second class, he was appointed head of the school.

In 1975 Yosef was appointed rabbi of the moshavim Nes Harim and Mata, both near Jerusalem, and began to deliver classes on halakha several times a week and care for other Jewish matters in the villages. As part of his responsibilities, he gave lectures and classes in the secular public schools and strengthened religious education there.

In 1992 Yosef expanded Hazon Ovadia to a yeshiva for boys high school age and older. This was necessary because of unrest among the Sephardi Haredi community stemming from disagreements with the Ashkenazi Litvak yeshiva.

On 24 July 2013 Yosef was elected to serve as Sephardi Chief Rabbi of Israel and Rishon Lezion, a position he will hold for a decade. The inauguration took place on 14 August 2013 at the official residence of the President of Israel.

With the death of Yosef's father, the Shas political party lost its spiritual leader. Having been elected Sephardi Chief Rabbi, Yosef appeared to be in a healthy position to inherit the authority of his father as the spiritual leader of Shas. But since he holds a position of public office, Yosef is prohibited by law from being politically active. Until the election, he never held any formal public office.

On 21 August 2013 Yosef released a psak halakha stating it is an obligation and mitzvah for parents to have their children vaccinated for polio virus.

In 2021 he endorsed the Alliance of Rabbis in Islamic States and serves as its Halachic guide.

Controversies

2016
In March 2016, Yosef called for religious Jews to keep their children away from secular or traditional members of their family because they could be a negative influence.

Later that month, when Israel Defense Forces (IDF) Chief of Staff Gadi Eisenkot told military staff that rules of engagement must respect the law, and soldiers should not kill an attacker who has already been subdued, Yosef said soldiers must kill anyone who comes to attack them regardless of legal or military repercussions. Later he said: "If they no longer have a knife, they must be put in prison for life until the Messiah comes and says who are Amalekites, and then we can kill them."

He also said that according to Jewish law, gentiles "should not live in the Land of Israel" unless they practice the seven Noahide Laws. Should they refuse to do so, they should be sent to Saudi Arabia. He added that non-Jews are allowed in Israel to serve the Jewish population. Leaders of the Anti-Defamation League (ADL) condemned Yosef's statements and called for their retraction. Jonathan Greenblatt and Carole Nuriel of ADL Israel called the remarks ignorant and intolerant. He was eventually pressured into retracting his comments.

There is constant controversy surrounding the authority of the Chief Rabbis over things like the conversion process, marriages, and semikhah (rabbinic ordination); due to the majority of Israel being secular or far less religious than the standards imposed by the Chief Rabbis.  In 2016, it was revealed that they held a list of beth dins whose conversions it will recognize, and maintained a secret blacklist of rabbis whose conversions they would not recognise. This list caused controversy, since there were a number of well-regarded Orthodox rabbis on the list, including Avi Weiss and Yehoshua Fass. These lists were kept secret, offering no opportunity for outside review or appeal, and led to some confusion. The situation became even more difficult when it was revealed that Haskel Lookstein, an Orthodox rabbi in the USA, was included on the blacklist, and some of his students were not permitted to marry in Israel. Lookstein was the officiating rabbi at Ivanka Trump's conversion and created some difficulties between Israel and the United States, since this was revealed shortly after the election of her father to the presidency. It was reported that even David Lau was opposed to Yosef's policy in regards to recognition of US converts. Soon after that, the rules were amended so that Trump's conversion was accepted, although there were some questions about whether that was done merely to curry favor with the new US president.

In December, he said that it was "not the way of the Torah" for women to join the IDF or even sign up for civilian national service: "All the great sages through the generations, including all Israel's chief rabbis, believe that it is forbidden for girls to go into the army... not just to the army – but to national service too."

2017
In May 2017, Yosef compared secular women to animals because they dressed immodestly.

2018
On 18 March 2018, Yosef allegedly likened people of black African descent to monkeys. He was speaking on the topic of the Meshaneh HaBriyot blessing in the Talmud concerning the sight of an unusual creature, either person or animal ("Blessed are you, Lord our God...who makes creatures different."). Examples of people given include "an (unusually) black, red, or white person, a giant, a dwarf, or one with spots", and of animals, examples include "an elephant, monkey, or vulture". In referring to black people, Yosef used the ancient term kushi, the term present in the Talmud. The term is considered derogatory in modern Hebrew, but in the Talmud it is equivalent to saying "African" (see Kingdom of Kush). He said: "Seeing a black person, you say the blessing. What black person? One who had a white mother and father, and came out black. Not on every black person do you make a blessing. When you walk in the streets of America, every five minutes, you see a black person. Will you say on him the blessing? Rather, it only needs to be on a black person whose mother and father are white. If, you know, two people birth a monkey or something like that, then you say the Different Creatures blessing." The Anti-Defamation League (ADL) tweeted that his comments were "utterly unacceptable".

2019
Following news that couples from the former Soviet Union were asked by rabbinical courts to take DNA tests in order to prove their Jewish heritage, Yosef, alongside David Lau, sought new legislation that would allow Israeli rabbinical courts to challenge the Jewishness of a person - even if he was not even registered for marriage, and did not apply for religious services.

2020
In January 2020, he was criticized for calling immigrants from the former Soviet Union "Communist, religion-hating" gentiles. Prime Minister Benjamin Netanyahu called Yosef’s remarks "outrageous" and said the immigrants from the former Soviet Union are a "huge blessing to the State of Israel and the Jewish people." Yosef's remarks also were slammed by others in the Knesset, including Knesset speaker Yuli Edelstein, who immigrated from Ukraine in 1987, and by Yisrael Beiteinu party leader Avigdor Liberman, who immigrated from Moldova. Yosef stood by his comments, saying they were distorted by politicians who had been inciting against Jews and Judaism and that he was only referring to a minority of immigrants.

2021
In January 2021, Yosef was criticized for flouting the coronavirus health restrictions; 

In June 2021, he said science and math are "nonsense", and students should only study Torah instead, adding proudly that he himself never finished school or received a diploma. Critics accused Yosef of promoting dependence on government handouts and charitable donations instead of advancing self-reliance. The large majority of ultra-Orthodox boys do not study the core curriculum of math, English, science and computer studies at elementary school level, and the overwhelming majority do not study this curriculum at high school level. Socioeconomic experts have warned that this failure to provide a basic education to boys in the Haredi sector combined with its high rate of population growth means the economy will be imperiled with an inadequate workforce for the 21st century. 

In July 2021, the rabbi stated that it's "better to live abroad than among secular Israelis".

References

1952 births
Living people
Israeli Sephardi Jews
Israeli Mizrahi Jews
Ovadia Yosef
Rishon LeZion (rabbi)
Sephardic Haredi rabbis in Israel
Authors of books on Jewish law
20th-century rabbis in Jerusalem
21st-century rabbis in Jerusalem